The 2018 season was SC Waterloo Region's eighth season in the Canadian Soccer League. Their season official commenced on June 2, 2018 in a home match against SC Real Mississauga. Overall the season was a successful one for the club as they finished in the top four by finishing third in the First Division. The previous time Waterloo finished in the top four was in 2015. In the postseason Waterloo defeated the Serbian White Eagles FC, but were eliminated in the semifinals to FC Vorkuta.The club's top goalscorer was Miodrag Kovacevic, a former player in the Serbian First League with six goals.

Summary 
In preparation for the 2018 season Waterloo appointed Radivoj Panić as the new head coach. The roster consisted of notable veterans such as Vladimir Zelenbaba, Adis Hasecic, Mohammad-Ali Heydarpour, and Sven Arapovic. After a slow start to the season the club rebounded to a seven match undefeated streak, and secured a postseason by finishing third in the standings. In the first round of the postseason Waterloo defeated Serbian White Eagles FC. In the semifinals they faced FC Vorkuta, but were eliminated in a penalty shootout.

Team

Roster

Management

Transfers

In

Competitions

Canadian Soccer League

First Division

Results summary

Results by round

Matches

Postseason

Statistics

Goals 
Correct as of September 30, 2018

References 

SC Waterloo Region
SC Waterloo Region
SC Waterloo Region
SC Waterloo Region seasons